Mark Hayes may refer to:

Mark Hayes (golfer) (1949–2018), American golfer
Mark Hayes (composer) (born 1953), American composer and arranger
Mark Gerard Hayes (born 1956), British/Irish economist and banker